Peng Shuzhi (also spelled Peng Shu-tse; ; 1896–1983) was an early leader of the Chinese Communist Party who was expelled from the party for being a Trotskyist. After the Communist victory in China, he lived in exile in Vietnam, France and the United States. His memoir was published in France by his daughter Cheng Yingxiang and son-in-law Claude Cadart.

Biography
Peng was born in Longhui County, Baoqing Prefecture, Hunan province in 1896. He joined the Chinese Socialist Youth League in 1920, and later was sent to study in Moscow. After returning to China in September 1924, he became a member of the Central Committee of the Chinese Communist Party, directed the propaganda work of the Party and edited its central journal during the revolution of 1925–1927. During this time he began living with Chen Bilan, whom he later married. He was expelled from the party in November 1929, together with Chen Duxiu, for supporting Trotskyism.

In 1949, on the eve of Communist victory in China, Peng fled Shanghai with his family to Hong Kong and then to Saigon, Vietnam in January 1950. After fellow Trotskyist Liu Jialiang was arrested and killed by Vietnamese agents, in June 1951 Peng fled again to Paris, then the headquarters of the Trotskyist Fourth International. In Paris, his daughter Cheng Yingxiang married the French sinologist Claude Cadart. They later organized, translated and published Peng's memoirs entitled L’envol du communisme en Chine. Peng and his wife moved to the United States in 1972. He died in Los Angeles in 1983.

Works
Peng Shu-tse, Leslie Evans: The Chinese Communist Party in Power. Pathfinder Press, 1980.
Li Fu-jen [Frank Glass], Peng Shu-tse: Revolutionaries in Mao’s Prisons: Case of the Chinese Trotskyists. 1974.

Literature
 Claude Cadart, Cheng Yingxiang: L’envol du communisme en Chine: Mémoires de Peng Shuzhi. Paris, Gallimard, 1983.
 Joseph T. Miller: Peng Shuzhi and the Chinese Revolution: Notes Toward a Political Biography. In: Historical Materialism 12/2000; 8(1), p. 265-266.
 Chén Bìlán: Wǒ de huíyì – yī gè Zhōngguó gémìngzhě de huígù 《我的回憶—一個中國革命者的回顧》. Hong Kong, Shíyuè shūwū 十月書屋 1994.
 Chén Bìlán: Zǎoqī Zhōng-Gòng yǔ Tuōpài – wǒde gémìng shēngyá huìyì 《早期中共與托派—我的革命生涯會議》. Hong Kong, Tiāndì túshū yǒuxiàn gōngsī 天地圖書有限公司 2010.

See also
Wang Fanxi

Notes

1896 births
1983 deaths
Chinese emigrants to France
Chinese emigrants to the United States
Chinese expatriates in the Soviet Union
Chinese dissidents
Chinese Trotskyists
Communist University of the Toilers of the East alumni
Delegates to the 4th National Congress of the Chinese Communist Party
Delegates to the 5th National Congress of the Chinese Communist Party
Expelled members of the Chinese Communist Party
Heads of the Publicity Department of the Chinese Communist Party
Members of the 4th Central Executive Committee of the Chinese Communist Party
National University of Peking alumni
People from Shaoyang